Makasi may refer to:

Places
 Toniki, a Roman era market town about modern day Makasi, Somalia
 Makasi, Barawa District, Lower Shabelle, Somalia; a modern locality about the ancient Toniki

People
 Makási, the Yamakasi freerunner group of parkour artists
 Moses Makasi (born 1985) British soccer player
 Saïd Makasi (born 1982) Rwandan soccer player
 Xoliswa Caroline Makasi, a South African politician in the 25th South African Parliament, see List of National Assembly members of the 25th Parliament of South Africa

Other uses
 Tentax makasi (T. makasi), a moth

See also

 
 Masaki (disambiguation)